Alburnia is an extinct genus of shrimp in the order Decapoda. It contains the species Alburnia petinensis.

References

Palaemonoidea
Early Cretaceous crustaceans
Monotypic crustacean genera
Prehistoric crustacean genera
Fossils of Italy
Albian genera
Cretaceous Italy
Early Cretaceous arthropods of Europe